Konstantine "Kote" Marjanishvili, also known by the Russified name Konstantin Aleksandrovich Mardzhanov (May 28, 1872 – April 17, 1933), was a Georgian theater director regarded as an important contributor to the pre- and post-revolutionary evolution of Georgian, Russian and Soviet stages. One of the most prestigious and professional of Georgia’s directors, he was particularly famous for his lavish and massive theater shows.

Early career 
 
He was born to a well-to-do literary family of an army officer in Kvareli, eastern Georgia, then part of the Tiflis Governorate, Russian Empire. After acting and directing in his native country from 1893 to 1909, he went to Russia proper, Russifying his surname as Mardzhanov.

He worked for Russian provincial theaters as an actor, then as a director, until he established himself in the Moscow Nezlobin troupe in 1906 and later co-founded the Georgian Drama Studio with Alexander Yuzhin. He quickly gained a reputation as one of the most talented followers of the well-known Russian actor and theater director Konstantin Stanislavsky (1863-1938). As a director, Marjanishvili’s main technique was to guide the actor in finding an instinctive path to realizing "outer truth". In 1910, his versatility was recognized by Stanislavsky himself who invited him at the same time as Edward Gordon Craig to open up the repertoire and production techniques of the Moscow Art Theatre. There he staged works by Knut Hamsun and Henrik Ibsen and assistant-directed the Nemirovich-Danchenko Brothers Karamazov (1910) and the Craig Hamlet (1911). Fascinated by Craig’s stylized manner of using puppets, Marjanishvili temporarily returned to Georgia to stage Oedipus Rex in a similar spirit. In 1913, he broke with Stanislavsky due to his left-wing sympathies and his interest in decadence, and organized the eclectic "Free Theater", where he staged opera, operetta, drama and pantomime. The enterprise, notable for its ties with the composer Sergei Rachmaninoff and the singer Feodor Chaliapin, and for its Georgian-type choreography, was rendered abortive in a year due largely to financial problems. He then moved to Rostov-on-Don, where he directed the local theater from 1914 to 1915.

Post-revolution years 

Marjanishvili’s 1917 production of Oscar Wilde’s Salomé was a true triumph and continued to be staged during the tumultuous years of revolution and civil war in Kiev (Kiyv, Ukraine), Moscow, Petrograd (St. Petersburg, Russia), and Tiflis (Tbilisi, Georgia). Marjanishvili’s simultaneous experiments with festive staging in Rostov-on-Don (1914-15) and Petrograd (1916-17) led him to coordinate the mass spectacle Toward a Worldwide Commune (co-directed by Nikolai Petrov, Sergei Radlov, Vladimir Solovyov and Adrian Piotrovsky, 1920). For years, he also worked in films (1916-28).

Returning to the recently Sovietized Georgia in 1922, he led the Rustaveli Theater in Tbilisi. By that time, the energetic young director Sandro Akhmeteli had also returned to Tbilisi to lead the younger actors in a coup against the establishment. The two men collaborated with respect and unease, but Akhemeteli’s nearly despotic rule over his artistic corporation "Duruji" proved too violent for Marjanishvili whose production had become more restrained, motivated by his own conviction that "there’s enough suffering in life without showing it on the stage." In 1926, he and part of the company left to form a provincial touring theatre, centered on Kutaisi and Batumi, leaving Akhmeteli in sole control of the Rustaveli Theater. The new theater came to be known as The Second State Georgian Theater and would eventually be named the Marjanishvili Theater after its founder (1933). The theater is still functional in Tbilisi and continues Marjanishvili’s eclectic and somewhat conformist traditions.

In his later years, Marjanishvili worked at the Korsh Theater (Театр Корша) (1931-1932), the Maly Theater (Малый театр) and the Operetta Theater in Moscow (1933). Marjanishvili’s new repertoire was largely Russian and conformed to Bolshevik doctrine, which won him awards at the Moscow Drama Olympiad of 1930. Yet, menacing charges against Marjanishvili soon began to appear in the Soviet press. He died of illness in Moscow on 17 April 1933 before the worsening political climate led to Joseph Stalin's Great Purge which would take the life of Marjanishvili’s erstwhile collaborator and rival Sandro Akhemeteli in 1937.

Filmography 
 Before the Hurricane, 1924
 Krazana, 1926
 Amok, 1927

 Notes 

 External links 
  in IMDb

 References 
 Шабалина, Татьяна (Shabalina, Tatiyana). "Марджанов, Константин Александрович." Энциклопедия Кругосвет (Entsiklopediya Krugosvet''). Retrieved on May 7, 2007.

1872 births
1933 deaths
Burials at Mtatsminda Pantheon
Theatre directors from Georgia (country)
Soviet theatre directors